Emidio Angelo (1903 – September 2, 1990) was an American cartoonist. Born to Italian immigrants, he studied at the Pennsylvania Academy of the Fine Arts. He was a cartoonist for The Philadelphia Inquirer from 1937 to 1954, and his comic strip, Emily and Mabel, was printed in 150 newspapers in the 1950s. Angelo won a gold medal from the Philadelphia Sketch Club in 1969 for The Curio Shop. From the 1980s to his death, he was a cartoonist for the Main Line Times.

References

1903 births
1990 deaths
American people of Italian descent
People from Philadelphia
Pennsylvania Academy of the Fine Arts alumni
American cartoonists